Dainius Saulėnas (born 13 March 1979) is a Lithuanian football forward who plays in Lithuanian I Lyga for FK Vidzgiris Alytus.

Successes

 2x Lithuanian Championship Winner with Žalgiris Vilnius (1998/99) and FK Ekranas (2008)
 2x Lithuanian Football Cup Winner (1997), (2003) with Žalgiris Vilnius

Club career
He previously played for Jagiellonia Białystok in Poland.

International career
Saulėnas made three appearances for the Lithuania national football team from 1997 to 1999.

References

External links
 
 

1979 births
Living people
Lithuanian footballers
Lithuania international footballers
FK Žalgiris players
Lithuanian expatriate sportspeople in Poland
Expatriate footballers in Poland
Jagiellonia Białystok players
FC Vilnius players
FK Ekranas players
JK Narva Trans players
Association football midfielders
Lithuanian expatriate sportspeople in Estonia
Expatriate footballers in Estonia